Mark Mentors is a Nigerian basketball club based in Abuja. Founded in 2012, team plays in the Nigerian Premier League. In 2015, the Mentors won their first national championship. 

In 2018, the club announced its plans to move from Abuja to Otukpo to play in the Otukpo Indoor Sports Hall when it is finished.

Honours
Nigerian Premier League
Champions (1): 2015
Runners-up (2): 2013, 2014

Players

Notable players

 Abdul Yahaya

References

External links
Mark Mentors BC at Eurobasket.com
Basketball teams in Nigeria
Basketball teams established in 2012